The Humanist Party (PU) is a minor political party in Italy. Founded in 1984, the party is a member of the Humanist International. It has never been represented in either the Italian Chamber of Deputies or the Italian Senate, the two houses of the Parliament of Italy.

Its long-time leader was Giorgio Schultze (secretary since 1996 to 2003), who is currently spokesman of the Humanist Movement in Europe. In 2005 Marina Larena was elected new secretary of the party.

The party did not take part to the 2008 general election, but some Humanist activists ran as independents in the lists of The Left – The Rainbow and For the Common Good, both left-wing coalitions. In the 2009 European Parliament election, Schultze run as a candidate for Italy of Values (IdV). This choice was criticized by those who acknowledged the IdV's law and order policies over immigration.

In 2010, after a period of organizational difficulties, Tony Manigrasso was elected secretary of the party and he was reconfirmed also in 2012. In 2014 he was replaced by Valerio Colombo. Subsequently Giovanna Ubaldeschi was appointed secretary of the party.

References

External links
Official website

1985 establishments in Italy

Italy
Italy
Political parties established in 1985
Political parties in Italy